"Bizcochito" is a song recorded by Spanish singer and songwriter Rosalía. It is the seventh track on her third studio album, Motomami, which was released on 18 March 2022 through Columbia Records. The song was written and produced by Rosalía herself alongside Michael Uzowuru, with David Rodríguez serving as a miscellaneous producer. "Bizcochito" is an upbeat chiptune track featuring avant-garde elements driven by a dembow base, filtered instrumentation and light vocals. The song title references the 2004 track "Saoco", by Wisin and Daddy Yankee, marking the second time Rosalía references it, the first one being in her single "Saoko", released earlier that year.

Upon Motomami release, "Bizcochito" was met with acclaim from music critics, with compliments directed towards its early video game-like Super Mario-inspired beat and change of pace inside the album. Nevertheless, it met mixed popular acclaim, often being memeified on social media. Despite not being promoted as a radio single, "Bizcochito" became popular on TikTok later in the summertime after viral trends surged off the Motomami World Tour, peaking at number thirteen on the PROMUSICAE chart in Spain while also entering the charts in Portugal and the Billboard Global Excl. U.S.

Background
In November 2018, Rosalía released her second studio album El mal querer, which she wrote and co-produced with el Guincho, her long-time collaborator. The album reimagines the folk and flamenco sound of Rosalía's previous album, Los ángeles (2017), by mixing it with elements of radio-friendly pop and urban crossover in an experimental key. Rosalía would expand her horizons and venture in reggaeton the following year, reaching mainstream audiences worldwide with songs like "Con altura" or "Yo x ti, tu x mi".

On El Mal Querer follow-up Motomami, Rosalía aimed to experiment beyond her earlier albums' new flamenco sound. Initially planning to confect four different projects, Rosalía committed to a color palette at the sound level, which resulted in Motomami. "Bizcochito" is one of the many songs Rosalía wrote during COVID-19 lockdown in Miami, before starting a nine-month mixing and mastering process in Los Angeles. Rosalía ended co-producing the song as well as any other track on the album. "Bizcochito" was recorded by engineer and songwriter David Rodríguez; and mixed by Manny Marroquín at Larrabee, Hollywood. Chris Gehringer mastered the track in New Jersey.

On 4 March 2022, two weeks before the release of Motomami, the soundtrack of Gran Turismo 7 titled Find Your Line, featuring "Bizcochito", was released through Sony Interactive. In July, the song was added to Fortnite.

Composition

"Bizcochito" is a chiptune song with dembow, champeta, and avant-garde elements that runs for one minute and forty-nine seconds. It is the third shortest song on Motomami and the seventh shortest in her discography. Described by Rolling Stone as a track "so playful it sounds like an ice cream truck rolling through the neighborhood", during the song Rosalía alludes the criticism she has received during her career in a sarcastic writing tone and a "childish", burlesque vocal tonality, mocking and infantilizing the criticism she receives in a funny tone. Lyrical references include Mala Rodríguez and Haraca Kiko. In 2023, album producer Noah Goldstein told Rolling Stone that the label was not sure about "Bizcochito" but Rosalía "was very adamant about keeping it on the album".

The title references the 2004 song "Saoco" by Wisin and Daddy Yankee, which she also referenced in her 2022 single "Saoko". Also, "Bizcochito" interpolates "Dangerous", performed by Busta Rhymes and samples the last part of a freestyle rap unreleased track produced by el Guincho she sung during the encore shows of El Mal Querer Tour. Additional melodic inspirations include Mr. Vegas, Plan B, Tokischa, Las Guanabanas, Master Joe, Ivy Queen, el General, Popcaan, Héctor el Father, Rochy RD, and the theme song of Super Mario Bros.

Remix 
"Bizcochito" has been remixed multiple times by novel disc-jockeys including Parkineos and Matias Deago, offering a new vision of the song. An official remix, produced by Leo RD, of the song was released exclusively on Amazon Music on 20 October 2022. It features guest vocals by Dominican rapper Haraca Kiko, who Rosalía references on the original cut.

Credits and personnel
Credits adapted from the liner notes of Motomami.
 Mixed by Manny Marroquín at Larrabee Studio, West Hollywood, California.
 Mastered by Chris Gehringer at Sterling Sound, Edgewater, New Jersey.

Production personnel
 Rosalía Vila – production, lyrics, composition; vocals, beat, vocal arrangement.
 Michael Uzowuru – production, composition; beat.
 David Rodríguez – production, composition, additional production.
 Raúl Alejandro – additional production.
 Nicole Esteller – background vocals.
 Carolina Hernández – background vocals.

Technical personnel
 Manny Marroquin – mixing
 Zach Peraya – assistant mix engineer
 Jeremie Inhaber – assistant mix engineer
 Anthony Vilchis – assistant mix engineer
 Chris Gehringer – mastering

Charts

Certifications

Release history

References

2022 songs
Rosalía songs
Songs written by Michael Uzowuru
Songs written by Rosalía